The Abbey of Echternach is a Benedictine monastery in the town of Echternach, in eastern Luxembourg.  The Abbey was founded in the 7th century by St Willibrord, the patron saint of Luxembourg.  For three hundred years, it benefited from the patronage of a succession of rulers, and was the most powerful institution in Luxembourg.

The abbey is currently a popular tourist attraction mostly on account of an annual dancing procession that is held every Whit Tuesday. Tens of thousands of tourists, day-trippers, pilgrims, and clergy visit Echternach to witness or participate in the traditional ceremony.

History

Willibrord

Located by the River Sauer, Echternach had originally been the site of a 1st-century Roman villa. By the 6th century, the estate had been passed to the see of Trier, who constructed a small monastery on the estate. In 698, Irmina of Oeren granted the Northumbrian missionary Willibrord, Bishop of Utrecht, land at Echternach to build a larger monastery, appointing Willibrord as abbot. In part, the choice was due to Willibrord's reputation as a talented proselytiser (he is known as the Apostle to the Frisians).

Willibrord opened the first church at Echternach in 700 with financial backing from Pepin of Herstal. Pepin's son, Charles Martel, founder of the Carolingian dynasty, had his son Pepin the Short baptised at Echternach in 714.  In addition to Carolingian support, Willibrord's abbey at Echternach had the backing of Wilfrid, with whom he had served at Ripon. Willibrord secured the backing of many Irish monks, who would become part of the first settlement at Echternach.

Willibrord spent much time at Echternach, and died there in 739.  Willibrord was buried in the oratory, which soon became a place of pilgrimage, particularly after he was canonised.  In 751, Pepin declared the Abbey of Echternach a 'royal abbey', and granted it immunity.

Carolingian Renaissance
Beornrad, the third abbot of Echternach, was a great favourite of Charlemagne, and was promoted to Archbishop of Sens in 785.  When Beornrad died, in 797, Charlemagne took direct control of the abbey for a year.

The work of the monks at the abbey was heavily influenced by Willibrord's roots in Northumbria and Ireland, where a great emphasis was put on codices, and Echternach developed one of the most important scriptoria in the Frankish Empire.  The abbey at Echternach produced four gospels (in order of production): the Augsburg Gospels, Maaseyck Gospels, Trier Gospels, and the Freiburg Gospel Book Fragment.

Manuscripts produced at Echternach are known to have been in both insular and Roman half uncial script.  As Echternach was so prolific, and enjoyed the patronage of Pepin the Short and Charlemagne, it played a crucial role in the development of the early Carolingian Renaissance.  Seeing the work of the abbey at Echternach at taming the native German script, and eager to further the reform, Charlemagne sent for Alcuin,  to establish a scriptorium at the court in Aachen.  Alcuin synthesised the two styles into the standard Carolingian minuscule, which predominated for the next four centuries.

At the start of the ninth century, a larger, Carolingian-style church was constructed, but it was destroyed in a fire some 200 years later. The abbey, as it enjoyed power, both spiritual and temporal.  However, this was all guaranteed only by the Carolingians.  When the authority of the centralised Frankish state collapsed during the civil wars under Louis the Pious, so too did the power of the abbey.  In 847, the Benedictine monks were ejected and replaced by lay-abbots.

Return of the Benedictine monks

The fortunes of the abbey continued to vary with the fortunes of the Holy Roman Empire.  When Otto the Great reunited the Empire, he sought to rejuvenate the intellectual and religious life of his dominions, including Echternach.  In 971, he restored the Benedictines to Echternach with forty monks of that order from Trier.  The abbey entered a second Golden Age, as it once again became one of northern Europe's most influential abbeys. In 1031, a new Romanesque church was consecrated.

The Codex Aureus of Echternach, an important surviving codex written entirely in gold ink was produced here in the 11th century. The so-called Emperor's Bible and the Golden Gospels of Henry III were also produced in Echternach at this time, when production of books at the scriptorium peaked.

The modern abbey
Around the middle of the 19th century, the quire began to crumble and it was feared that it might collapse completely. For this reason, an association was founded in 1862 for the reconstruction of the church (the Kirchbauverein). The rebuilding in a neo-roman style was completed in 1868, and the abbey was re-consecrated.

In recognition of its importance as a national centre of pilgrimage to St. Willibrord, Pope Pius XII granted the abbey the status of minor basilica in 1939.

Part of the basilica was destroyed by shells in 1944, necessitating another reconstruction - its sixth in 14 centuries - in the original Roman style. the facade is a nod to the basilica of Paray-le-Monial. The building was again re-consecrated in 1953, though the 8th century crypt has survived throughout with no major damage.

Chronology of churches
There have been six churches built on the site at Echternach:

Unknown - 700: Original pre-abbey church
700 - c.800: Merovingian church
c.800 - 1016: Carolingian church
1031 - 1797: Original Romanesque basilica
1862 - 1944: Reconstructed basilica
1953–present day: Modern basilica

Dancing procession

Despite the long history of the abbey and the city, Echternach is best known today for its traditional dancing procession, held around the town of Echternach.  It is held every Whit Tuesday in honour of Saint Willibrord, and is the last such traditional dancing procession in Europe.  The event draws to Echternach tens of thousands of visitors a year, be they pilgrims or tourists, who either participate or observe the quaint and distinctive procession.

Library
On 9 February 2010 Otto Harrassowitz Verlag, Wiesbaden, published a two-volume catalogue of the manuscripts in the library on behalf of the Bibliothèque nationale de Luxembourg.

List of abbots

Burials
Saint Willibrord
Henry IV, Count of Luxembourg

See also
List of Carolingian monasteries
Carolingian architecture
Codex Aureus of Echternach
Echternach Gospels

References

Churches completed in 1953
Residential buildings completed in 1953
Echternach, Abbey of
Echternach, Abbey of
Carolingian architecture
Echternach
Basilica churches in Europe
Architecture in Luxembourg
7th-century establishments in Luxembourg
Churches completed in 700